Ptectisargus is a genus of flies in the family Stratiomyidae.

Species
Ptectisargus abditus (Lindner, 1936)
Ptectisargus argentipellitus (Lindner, 1966)
Ptectisargus brunneus (Lindner, 1936)
Ptectisargus cingulatus (Lindner, 1968)
Ptectisargus flavifrons (Lindner, 1968)
Ptectisargus flavomarginatus (Loew, 1857)
Ptectisargus gracilipes (Lindner, 1936)
Ptectisargus keiseri (Lindner, 1966)
Ptectisargus lindneri James, 1975
Ptectisargus longestylus (Lindner, 1966)
Ptectisargus punctus (Lindner, 1968)
Ptectisargus unicolor (Lindner, 1968)

References

Stratiomyidae
Brachycera genera
Taxa named by Erwin Lindner
Diptera of Africa